Jocelyn "Joe" Faisal Jules Fournier (born 23 January 1983) is an English businessman and professional boxer. He started a fitness business, before selling it and then subsequently moved into the nightclub industry.

He held the WBA International light-heavyweight title in 2017 after defeating Wilmer Mejia. He had an exhibition fight with boxer David Haye on 11 September 2021 and lost via unanimous decision.

Early life 

It is reported by some outlets that Fournier was born in Monaco, before moving to London, England. Although The Times says he was born in London and moved to Monaco. Fournier attended Lycée Français Charles De Gaulle de Londres in Kensington then American Community School.
After his parents' divorce Fournier moved to Hounslow with his mother and attended Ashton House primary and then Isleworth & Syon School. When living with his mother Fournier "went from having a chauffeur driven car to school every day, to taking the bus."

Fournier studied human biology and sports science at St Mary's University. He splits his time between Miami, Florida and London.

Business 

After being forced to retire from basketball due to a scaphoid injury, Fournier set up his own gym where he acted as "a trainer, PR, and cleaner, all-in-one."

Fournier grew the gym business and gained recognition as a personal trainer with a roster of celebrity clients. Fournier wrote Red Carpet Workout in 2008 of which he said: "Growing up, I was street-smart but got a D in English, so publishing a book made my mum and my family proud. I get royalties from it and got quite a bit up front too, about £30,000 which I split with my agent and the ghostwriter."

Fournier sold his fitness business and studios to a FTSE 100 company in 2012.
He made his money by owning the freehold to his gyms having moved into real estate almost by mistake.
"It wasn't the gyms that brought the fortune, it was that I held the Freehold leases to the properties," he explains. "I ended up selling all 14 locations to a FTSE 100 company and that was my first real kill."

Fournier invested in nightclubs, opening and owning Whisky Mist, The Rose Club, Bonbonniere London and Streaky Gin. Most recently he opened Bonbonniere Mikonos. Fournier invested in nightclubs stating, "It's really difficult to get people to do lunges and eat salad, but it was easy getting people get pissed, drink gin and tonic, party, and eat pizza."

Boxing career

Professional career 

In 2015 Fournier took up boxing professionally. He is signed to Hayemaker Promotions. His record currently stands as 9 wins 1 No Contest with all wins by TKO. He made his debut in the light heavyweight division against Jorge Burgos in the Dominican Republic. He defeated Manuel Regalado and Pedro Sencion before appearing on the undercard of David Haye-Arnold Gjergjaj on 21 May 2016 at the O2 Arena, London. Fournier defeated Bela Juhasz inside two rounds.

Fournier vs Stini 
Fournier then fought in Belgium beating Mustapha Stini. Fournier, had "no real problems" defeating Stini.

Elliot Worsell wrote on website boxingnewsonline.net that "What does appear on Fournier's BoxRec record, however, are details of a failed drug test (for sibutramine), for which he was banned by NADO until December 2020, following a bout with Mustapha Stini in June 2016".

Fournier vs. Reykon 
On 17 April 2021, Fournier fought Colombian singer Reykon. Fournier defeated Reykon via corner retirement after the 1st round. Fournier came under fire for making a derogatory comment about Colombians and kidnappings during the first press conference.

Exhibition bouts

Fournier vs Mejia 
Fournier won the vacant WBA international light heavyweight belt by defeating Wilmer Mejia in the eighth round in the Dominican Republic. Fournier moved up to 11th in the rankings thanks to this victory against his first southpaw opponent. Fournier used the victory to reiterate his desire to fight fellow countryman Callum Smith saying, "I will buy him a jet plane or a house if he fights me!"

Haye vs Fournier 
On 11 September 2021, Fournier suffered his first loss against his friend and former two-division world champion David Haye in an exhibition bout via unanimous decision on the undercard of Evander Holyfield vs. Vitor Belfort.

Personal life 
Fournier went to school with Sir Mo Farah and classes him as one of his closest friends.

Charity work 

Fournier supports Caudwell Children and runs the Joe Fournier Foundation. The latter pays for coaching and after-school clubs in Hounslow.

Boxing record

Professional

Exhibition

References 

1983 births
Living people
English male boxers
English businesspeople
Doping cases in boxing